The Diamante River is a river in the Argentine province of Mendoza. It is born from glaciers on the Maipo, a volcano in the Andes range in the Argentine–Chilean border, and flows east until emptying in the Desaguadero River.

Course 
The Diamante is fed by ice-thaw-fed streams that flow into its source, the Diamante Lake.

The upper course of the river turns south and then back north, and becomes entrenched within the deep, narrow Agua del Toro Canyon, where it is dammed to produce hydroelectricity by the Agua del Toro Dam, at about 69° W, and a few kilometres later by the Los Reyunos Dam. Together these two power stations generate 500 MW.

Upon reaching the plain, the Diamante loses part of its volume through infiltration and evaporation. It turns in a gentle arc, passing south of the city of San Rafael, in the geographical center of Mendoza, where it is used for irrigation (together with the Atuel River).  

The river splits in multiple branches shortly before reaching the Desaguadero (here called Salado), on the border with the province of San Luis.

References
 Mendoza Informa. Río Diamante.
 Geografía de Mendoza.
 A la Niña Summit. Some Effects of La Niña on Summer Rainfall, Water Resources and Crops in Argentina.

Rivers of Argentina
D